Cape Wrangell is considered to be the westernmost point of Alaska and all of the United States by direction of travel, named after the Russian explorer and seaman Ferdinand von Wrangel. It is located on Attu Island, which is situated in the Near Islands.

References

External links
Infoplease.com

Landforms of Aleutians West Census Area, Alaska
Wrangell